DRAFT was an American magazine about beer and beer culture, published between September 2006 and August 2017 by DRAFT Publishing. Erika Rietz was the founder and editor-in-chief. The magazine was headquartered in Phoenix, Arizona.

It was purchased by Christopher Byron Rice in 2017. He discontinued the print edition of the magazine

Rice, who was also the owner of All About Beer magazine filed for chapter 7 bankruptcy and personal bankruptcy in March 2019, citing $4.5 million in debt.

The magazine published the 2013 edition of its “America’s 100 best beer bars” list.

See also
 List of food and drink magazines

References

External links
 

Bimonthly magazines published in the United States
Lifestyle magazines published in the United States
Beer journalism
Defunct magazines published in the United Kingdom
Food and drink magazines
Magazines established in 2006
Magazines disestablished in 2018
Magazines published in Arizona
Works about beer